Chromos Tower is a  office tower in Zagreb, Croatia. The tower was constructed in 1989 and was originally the main headquarters of the Chromos Corporation after which it was named. It is located in Kanal neighborhood, on the corner of the Vukovar Street and Vjekoslav Heinzel street. It is last skyscraper built in Zagreb before the Croatian War of Independence (1991-1995).

See also 

 List of tallest buildings in Croatia

Buildings and structures in Zagreb
Office buildings completed in 1989
Skyscraper office buildings in Croatia